Football Club Metalist 1925 Kharkiv is a professional football club from Kharkiv, Ukraine. Founded in 2016, the club plays in the Ukrainian Premier League. Their home stadium is Metalist Oblast Sports Complex with 40,003 capacity.

Metalist 1925 was promoted to the Ukrainian Premier League after finishing in third place in the 2020–21 Ukrainian First League. They earned promotion on two previous occasions: placing second in the  2016–17 Ukrainian Football Amateur League and placing third in the 2017–18 Ukrainian Second League.

History
The club was established in the summer of 2016 after the original club, FC Metalist Kharkiv, was refused a license by the Football Federation of Ukraine and expelled from national competitions.

On the initiative of former Metalist player Volodymyr Linke, among others, a new club was created under the name FC Metalist 1925 Kharkiv. It entered the Ukrainian Football Amateur League for the 2016–17 season and earned promotion to the Ukrainian Second League the next year.

Infrastructure
Metalist 1925 plays its games at Metalist Stadium. It has its own training site in the town of Vysoki.

Squad

Players

On loan

Administration
 Owner – LLC FC Metalist 1925 Kharkiv
 Co-owner – Solar Solutions Ukraine and Borky Solar
 CEO – Yaroslav Vdovenko

Managers
 Oleksandr Pryzetko (16 Aug 2016 – 26 Sep 2017)
 Vyacheslav Khruslov (caretaker) (26 Sep 2017 – 28 Sep 2017)
 Oleksandr Ivanov (28 Sep 2017 – 3 May 2018)
 Serhiy Ralyuchenko (caretaker) (3 May 2018 – 8 May 2018)
 Serhiy Valyayev (8 May 2018 – 11 September 2018)
 Oleksandr Horyainov (caretaker) (11 September 2018 – 10 December 2018)
 Oleksandr Horyainov (10 December 2018 – 4 June 2019)
 Andriy Demchenko (4 June 2019 – 21 July 2020)
 Vyacheslav Khruslov (caretaker) (21 July 2020 – 21 Aug 2020)
 Valeriy Kriventsov (21 Aug 2020 – 22 Oct 2022)
 Edmar (caretaker) (23 Oct 2022 – present)

Honours
Ukrainian First League
Third place (1): 2020–21

Ukrainian Second League
Third place (1): 2017–18

Ukrainian Amateur Football Championship
Runners-up (1): 2016–17

Seasons

Notes

References

External links
 
 “Ми більше не хочемо президента-олігарха“. Сергій Стороженко про Металіст 1925. UA-Football (www.ua-football.com). 29 May 2017

 
Football clubs in Kharkiv
Ukrainian Premier League clubs
Association football clubs established in 2016
2016 establishments in Ukraine